John Stack may refer to:

 John K. Stack Jr. (1884–1935), Michigan Auditor General
 John M. Stack (1852–1927), American politician
 John F. Stack (1950–2022), American professor of politics, international relations, and law
 John Stack (politician) (1845–1897), Irish nationalist politician, Member of Parliament (MP) for North Kerry 1885–1892
 John Stack (rower) (1924–1997), American rower, gold medallist at the 1948 Summer Olympics
 John Stack (engineer), (1906–1972) American aerospace engineer, won two Collier trophies